Cristian Alejandro Ortíz Acosta (born 3 May 1999) is a Mexican footballer who plays as a midfielder.

Career

Guadalajara
Ortiz joined Chivas in 2013, graduating through their youth teams before going on loan Zacatepec in 2019, where he made five appearances during the Copa MX Clausura. He made his sole appearance for Chivas in 2020 in a 2–1 Copa MX defeat against Dorados de Sinaloa on 21 January 2020. He was released by the club on 21 June 2020.

Austin Bold
In August 2020, Ortíz joined USL Championship side Austin Bold. He made his debut for Austin on 22 August 2020, appearing as a 67th-minute substitute during a 3–2 win over Rio Grande Valley FC.

References

External links 
 

1999 births
Living people
Association football midfielders
Mexican footballers
Mexican expatriate footballers
Expatriate soccer players in the United States
C.D. Guadalajara footballers
Club Atlético Zacatepec players
Austin Bold FC players
USL Championship players
Footballers from Baja California
Sportspeople from Tijuana